A line of duty death is a death in the fire service or the police service while on duty.

United States

Firefighting
The National Fire Protection Association (NFPA) report has tracked on-duty firefighter deaths in the United States since 1977. The average annual number of on-duty firefighter deaths from 2014 to 2018 was 65. However, in 2019, there were 48 on-duty firefighter deaths in the United States, a sharp drop and the first year that the annual total was under 50 deaths. Of the 48 on-duty deaths in 2019, 20 were career firefighters and 25 were volunteer firefighters, one was a civilian Defense Department employee, one was a state land management employee, and one was a federal land management agency employee.

Sudden cardiac death has consistently constituted the largest share of on-duty firefighter deaths. Of 2019 on-duty firefighter deaths in the U.S., 54% were due to medical emergencies, overexertion, or stress (included in this category were 22 heart attacks or other sudden cardiac deaths, 2 strokes, 1 heatstroke, and 1 suicide); 13% by fire progress (such as being trapped or overrun) or explosions, 8% were struck by a vehicle, 8% died in vehicle crashes, 6% fell from heights (such as buildings, fire apparatus, roofs, and bridges), and 10% died from other causes. In 2019, of on-duty firefighter deaths, 27% died at fire sites (10 structure fires, 3 wildland fires), 19% died during non-fire emergencies, 19% died while responding to or returning from alarms, 10% died in training, and 25% died in other on-duty settings (such as performing ordinary fire station, administrative, or maintenance duties).

Police
An analysis of FBI data published in 2019 in the Criminology & Public Policy found that police line-of-duty deaths in the United States fell 75% between 1970 and 2016. The number of deaths from aircraft crashes and accidental gunfire declined over time, but deaths in car chases were stable, and deaths from vehicular assaults doubled. 

According to data compiled by the National Law Enforcement Officers Memorial, over the period 2010 to 2019, there were 1,627 U.S. police officer line-of-duty deaths, including 528 deaths by gunfire, 459 deaths from job-related illness, 335 deaths from automobile crashes, 130 from being struck by a vehicle, 58 in motorcycle crashes, 25 by drowning, 20 by beatings, 19 in falls, 13 in aircraft accidents, 5 by strangulation, 4 by being struck by train, 3 by electrocution, 2 in horse-related accidents, and 1 in a terrorist attack. Deaths in motor vehicle crashes or motor vehicle strikes represented about 43% of all police line-of-duty deaths over the period 2006 through 2019 (about 809 deaths); these are preventable injuries.

In 2019, 48 law enforcement officers died in line-of-duty injuries from "felonious incidents" while 41 died in accidents. Of the 48 deaths in felonious incidents, 15 were connected to "investigative/enforcement activities" (including traffic stops, investigations, and encounters with fugitives); 9 deaths were connected to "tactical situations" (such as barricade/hostage situations or service of search or arrest warrants); 5 officers died in unprovoked attacks; 4 officers died while responding to reports of crimes in progress; 3 officers died while in a car pursuits; 3 officers died while trying to make an arrest. Of the 41 accidental deaths, 19 died in motor vehicle crashes, 16 were pedestrians struck by vehicles; 3 died in "firearm-related incidents"; and 2 officers drowned.

More than 90% of homicides of U.S. law enforcement officers are caused by gunshot. For example, in 2019, 44 of the 49 officers feloniously killed were killed by firearms. A 2015 study published in the American Journal of Public Health, analyzing FBI data from 1996 to 2010, studied the link between firearm prevalence (measured by the mean household firearm ownership) and homicides of police officers using a Poisson regression. The study concluded that, when controlling for other variables, law enforcement homicide rates "were 3 times higher in states with high firearm ownership compared with states with low firearm ownership."

A 2018 white paper, commissioned by the Ruderman Family Foundation, found that U.S. police officers and U.S. firefighters were more likely to die by suicide than in the line of duty. Both police and firefighters have considerably higher rates of suicide when compared to the population at large. Citing prior studies, the white paper connected elevated suicide rates among police and firefighters to "critical incidents" (traumatic events) experienced in the line of duty, leading to higher rates of post-traumatic stress and depression. The white paper called for de-stigmatization of mental health concerns among first responders (stating that "shame and stigma are arguably the strongest barriers that stand between first responders and mental health services") and more suicide prevention initiatives for first responders.

United Kingdom

Police line-of-duty deaths are far less common in Britain than in the United States. From 1900 to 2014, 249 British police officers died in the line of duty; adjusting for number of police officers, U.S. police line-of-duty deaths are 10 times higher than British police line-of-duty deaths.

A comparison of police deaths in New York City and Greater London from 1900 through 1999 found that "both intentional and unintentional occupational police mortality rates were significantly greater in New York compared to London"; the study officers identified "socioeconomic, cultural, and occupational factors" (including the widespread prevalence of firearms in the U.S.) as the likely factors explaining the discrepancy.

References

Firefighting
Law enforcement